Mser (Msər), or Kousseri (Kuseri), is a moribund Afro-Asiatic language spoken in northern Cameroon and southwestern Chad.  Dialects are Gawi, Houlouf, Kabe, Kalo, Mser (Kuseri).

In Cameroon, Mser is spoken in Kousseri (Kousséri and Logone-Birni communes, Chari Department, Far North Region). It is also spoken in Chad. There is a total of 2,100 speakers (in both Cameroon and Chad).

References 

Biu-Mandara languages
Endangered Afroasiatic languages
Languages of Chad
Languages of Cameroon